DHA City Karachi is a housing estate being built in Gadap Town, which is located in the outskirts of Karachi, Sindh, Pakistan. The project spans over 11,640 acres.

Located 56 kilometers from Karachi, the community is planned to be self-dependent for water and electricity.  According to the Defence Housing Authority (DHA) master plan unveiled in 2011, construction costs are forecasted at 1 billion dollars and include two theme parks, one hospital, one university, 20 colleges and 40 schools.

New in DHA City 
ARY Laguna DHA City brings to you South Asia's first man-made lagoon & resort-style real estate project featuring 1-4 bedroom simplex & duplex apartments.

Transport

Airport
DHA City Karachi is located at a distance of 35 km from Jinnah International Airport, the largest airport of Pakistan.

Road

DHA City is accessible from the city of Karachi as well as Hyderabad by M-9 Motorway. The project is situated at a distance of 56 km from the city core area of Karachi.

To connect the DHA City Karachi with the DHA, the project developers planned the Malir Expressway. Sindh government started construction on Malir Expressway in 2022. The Expressway once completed in 2024 will cut down hour-long journey into just a 20 minute drive.

As per the DCK Transportation Plan there will be a myriad of road networks, major intersections, collector roads, service roads, roundabouts, one way regimes and the concept of using maximum public transport.

Public Transport
Public transportation consists of two street car trams, articulated modern buses, pedestrian areas and parking lots.

Bus Rapid Transit
The Karachi Bus Rapid Transit System (BRT) has been extended to DHA City Karachi.

See also 
 City District Government
 Karachi
 Sindh
 LDA City

References

External links 
 DHA Karachi
 Karachi Metropolitan Corporation
 

Neighbourhoods of Karachi
Gadap Town